Difenpiramide is a non-steroidal anti-inflammatory drug.

References 

2-Pyridyl compounds
Acetamides
Nonsteroidal anti-inflammatory drugs